North Andrew High School is a public secondary school in Rosendale, Missouri.

Currently
In 1996, North Andrew High School relocated to the junction of Highway 71 and Highway 48. As of the 2021-2022 school year, the school has 116 students.

On November 29, 2013, North Andrew High School won the Missouri 8-man football state championship, defeating Stanberry 16 to 13. It was the lowest-scoring eight-man championship games in MSHSAA history. North Andrew also won the 2014 MSHSAA state championship game against Stanberry 56 to 38 making the Cardinals back-to-back state champions. North Andrew previously won eight-man state championships in 1993 (co-champions by tie), 1996 and 1997.

External links 
District website
District profile

References 

Public high schools in Missouri
Schools in Andrew County, Missouri
Educational institutions established in the 1990s
1990s establishments in the United States